The Bridge University (TBU) is a university in South Sudan.

Location
The campus of The Bridge University is in the Altabara B neighborhood, in the city of Juba, the capital of South Sudan and the largest city in that country. This location lies in the southeastern section of the city, close to the White Nile River, at the point where the road to Nimule (A43) crosses over it. The approximate coordinates of the university campus are 4° 50' 6.00"N, 31° 36' 0.00"E (Latitude: 4.83500; Longitude: 31.60000). The coordinates are approximate because the university campus does not yet show on most publicly available maps.

History
The Bridge University was founded in 2009 as a post-secondary college. However, after one semester, the administration upgraded to a full university to meet the overwhelming demand for instruction. As of July 2011, the university has over 3000 students enrolled with over 65 full-time lecturers and over 45 part-time staff. The university offers certificate, diploma and first degree courses.

Academic units
, the university maintains the following faculties, departments and institutes:

 Faculty of Humanities & Social Sciences
 Faculty of Business Administration & Management
 Faculty of Science
 Department of Computer Science
 Department of Business Studies
 Department of Law 
 Department of Languages
 Department of Health Sciences
 Institute for Social Research
 Institute of Open and Distance Learning

Academic courses
, the university offers the following courses:

 Undergraduate degree courses

 Bachelor of International Relations & Diplomacy
 Bachelor of Public Administration & Management
 Bachelor of Development Studies
 Bachelor of Human Resources Management
 Bachelor of Project Planning & Management
 Bachelor of Social Work & Social Administration
 Bachelor of Accounting & Finance
 Bachelor of Statistics & Applied Economics
 Bachelor of Business Administration
 Bachelor of Micro Finance
 Bachelor of Procurement & Logistics Management
 Bachelor of Business Administration in Economics & International Finance
 Bachelor of Laws

 Undergraduate diploma courses

 Diploma in Public Administration & Management
 Diploma in Mass Communication
 Diploma in Development Studies
 Diploma in Human Resources Management
 Diploma in Project Planning & Management
 Diploma in Social Work & Social Administration
 Diploma in Accounting & Finance
 Diploma in Business Administration
 Diploma in Procurement & Logistics Management
 Diploma in Economics & International Finance
 Diploma in Information Technology
 Diploma in Secondary  Education 
 Diploma in Primary Education
 Diploma in Laboratory Science
 Diploma in Health Service Management

 Postgraduate courses
The university does not yet offer postgraduate courses.

 Certificate courses
TBU offers a variety of short courses which last from a few weeks to several months leading to the award of a certificate. Some of the certificate courses include:
 Certificate in computer hardware maintenance
 Oracle 9i
 PL/SQL Database programming.
 Advanced certificate in Computer Networking.
 Certificate in dynamic web design.
 Certificate in Computer Applications.
 Certificate in Statistical Data Analysis Using SPSS

External links
Approximate Location of The Bridge University Campus

See also
Juba, South Sudan
Central Equatoria
Equatoria
Education in South Sudan
List of universities in South Sudan

References

2009 establishments in South Sudan
Universities in South Sudan
Juba
Central Equatoria
Equatoria
Educational institutions established in 2009